The South American Roller Hockey Clubs Championship was to be the 28th edition of the Roller Hockey South American Club Championship. It was held in November 2013 in Santiago, in Chile.
The tournament was considered cancelled, after the illegalities committed during the tournament by the organization and the South American Roller Sports Confederation.

Teams

References

External links

S
South American Roller Hockey Clubs Championship
Roller hockey in South America
South American Roller Hockey Clubs Championship